Horná Strehová is a village and municipality in the Veľký Krtíš District of the Banská Bystrica Region of southern Slovakia.

History
In historical records, the village was first mentioned in 1493 (Zthergowa). It belonged to Divín and Modrý Kameň.

Genealogical resources
The records for genealogical research are available at the state archive "Statny Archiv in Banska Bystrica, Slovakia"

 Roman Catholic church records (births/marriages/deaths): 1811-1899 (parish B)
 Lutheran church records (births/marriages/deaths): 1725-1951 (parish A)

See also
 List of municipalities and towns in Slovakia

References

External links

Villages and municipalities in Veľký Krtíš District